Albert Leon Mamaux (May 30, 1894 – December 31, 1962) was a professional baseball player and manager.

A right-handed pitcher over parts of twelve seasons (1913–1924), Mamaux played mainly with the Pittsburgh Pirates and Brooklyn Robins. He led Pittsburgh with 21 wins in 1915 and 1916. During his career, he compiled a 76–67 with a 2.90 ERA. Mamaux played on one National League pennant winner, the Robins, in 1920. He pitched four innings in the 1920 World Series for Brooklyn.

From 1926 to 1933, Mamaux pitched for the Newark Bears of the International League. During the 1930 season, he replaced Tris Speaker as team manager, and in 1932 led the Bears to the league title. The 1932 team, which featured 15 former and future New York Yankees, had a record of 109–59 and is regarded as one of the best minor league teams in history. Mamaux also coached the Albany Senators from 1935 to 1936 and the Seton Hall Pirates baseball team from 1937 to 1942.

Mamaux, who was born in Pittsburgh, attended Duquesne University. He died in Santa Monica, California.

External links

1894 births
1962 deaths
Albany Senators players
Baseball players from Pennsylvania
Brooklyn Robins players
Duquesne Dukes baseball players
Huntington Blue Sox players
Major League Baseball pitchers
Minor league baseball managers
Newark Bears (IL) players
New York Yankees players
Pittsburgh Pirates players
Reading Keystones players
Seton Hall Pirates baseball coaches